Miracles from Heaven: A Little Girl, Her Journey to Heaven, and Her Amazing Story of Healing is a memoir written by an American author Christy Beam, released on April 14, 2015. The author wrote the book about her daughter Annabel Beam.

Plot 
The book is about the author's 10-year-old daughter Annabel Beam, who was diagnosed with a rare terminal stomach disorder. While on a visit home from the hospital she fell while climbing a tree with her older sister, a branch gave way sending Annabel 30 feet headfirst into the hollow trunk of a cottonwood tree. She was inside the trunk of the tree for several hours where she visits with Jesus who tells her she will be fine. She is finally rescued and taken to a hospital. She woke up at the hospital without any broken bones or internal injuries. After this incident, she no longer felt pain from her stomach disorder, and her doctor confirmed that her rare disease was somehow miraculously cured.

Film adaptation 

Sony Pictures Entertainment has produced a film adaptation, starring Jennifer Garner, Kylie Rogers, Queen Latifah, Martin Henderson, and Eugenio Derbez. It is directed by Patricia Riggen and scripted by Randy Brown. The film received mixed to positive reviews, with Garner's performance as Christy earning praise.

References

External links
 
 Miracles from Heaven at History vs. Hollywood

2015 non-fiction books
American non-fiction books
Evangelical Christian literature
Books about near-death experiences
Children and death
Heaven in popular culture
Memoirs adapted into films
Hachette Books books